Centro de Actividades Acuáticas de Alto Nivel (CAAAN) is a high performance training center for aquatic activities located in Mexico City.

CAAAN is the major center for the Instituto Mexicano del Seguro Social with the Unidad Morelos, who provide most of the
Olympic, Panamerican and Centroamerican medalists for swimming, diving, water polo and synchronized swimming. Many Olympic, Panamerican and Centroamerican divers train at CAAAN, including Porfirio Becerril, Carlos Girón, Jorge Mondragon, Juan Colin, Daniel Trejo, Eduardo Vaca, Eduardo Rueda, Francisco Rueda.

Sport in Mexico City